Nikolai Viitak (14 November 1896 – 24 April 1942 Sevurallag, Sverdlovsk Oblast, Russia) was an Estonian politician. He was a member of VI Riigikogu.

1937–1940 he was Minister of Communications.

References

1896 births
1942 deaths
Members of the Riigivolikogu